1000 Song Challenge, also known as Challenge 1000 Songs, is a South Korean karaoke singing competition television series, which aired on SBS from 2000 to 2014. During the show, guests compete by singing popular songs accurately from memory. The songs are chosen randomly from a pool of 1000 songs. Unlike normal karaoke, the lyrics are not shown, so it is easier to make mistakes. The contestants with the highest scores proceed to the next round. In one segment of the show, "Run Karaoke", contestants race to the microphone and whoever gets there first gets to sing a song and gain points. In another segment, the contestants hear the beginning of a song, and the first one to correctly name the song gains points. The winner of the final round receives household items as prizes, such a humidifier or espresso machine. Many popular celebrities were invited to the show, including BoA, Shinhwa and Girls' Generation.

The show began airing on October 22, 2000, and was extremely popular in its early years. It aired on Sunday mornings and had mainly older viewers. SBS cancelled the show in 2014 because advertisement revenue was low, and they wanted to target young people. The last episode aired on June 22, 2014.

Hosts
Various television personalities co-hosted the show throughout its nearly 14-year run. Comedian Lee Hwi-jae began hosting the show (with Jeong Hyeong-don) in April 2008, and continued until the show's cancellation in 2014. Trot singer Jang Yun-jeong first hosted the show for a year and a half, beginning in April 2006, and returned in August 2009. Lee and Jang were praised for their "smooth and entertaining" hosting style, and they won the "Best Couple Award" at the 2013 SBS Entertainment Awards. Jang left the show in April 2014 due to her pregnancy, and was replaced by Hyolyn.

References

External links
 

2000 South Korean television series debuts
2014 South Korean television series endings
2010s South Korean television series
Korean-language television shows
Singing talent shows
South Korean reality television series
Talent shows
Music competitions in South Korea
Television series by SM C&C
South Korean music television shows